Roberto Bernardini (born 21 January 1944) is an Italian professional golfer. He represented Italy 9 times in the World Cup between 1966 and 1975.

Most of his success came in continental Europe as he won a number of tournaments in his native Italy. He also won the Swiss Open in back to back years, 1968 and 1969. Late in 1969 he won the Agfa-Gevaert Tournament, an international tournament played in West Germany. He scored 281, defeating South Africa's Graham Henning by a stroke. It was his fourth win on the European circuit that year. This excellent play helped Bernardini qualify for the Masters Tournament in 1969 and 1970.

Bernardini had some success outside continental Europe, however. He reached the semi-final of the 1970 Long John Scotch Whisky Match Play Championship and finished joint third in the 1972 Sunbeam Electric Scottish Open. He also made a number of appearances in the Open Championship between 1966 and 1980 with best finishes of tied for 17th in 1970 and tied for 13th in 1972.

After reaching 50, Bernardini played on the European Seniors Tour, his best finish being runner-up in the 1996 Hippo Jersey Seniors.

Professional wins (19)
1966 Lancia d'Oro
1967 Italian Native Open, Lancia d'Oro
1968 Italian BP Open, Swiss Open, Italian Native Open, Agfa-Gevaert Tournament
1969 Walworth Aloyco Tournament, Swiss Open, Lancia d'Oro, Agfa-Gevaert Tournament
1971 Italian BP Open
1972 Shell Open di Alassio
1973 Italian Native Open
1975 Italian Native Open, Memorial Olivier Barras
1977 Italian PGA Championship
1979 Memorial Olivier Barras

Results in major championships

Note: Bernardini never played in the U.S. Open or PGA Championship.

CUT = missed the half-way cut (3rd round cut in 1968, 1971 and 1975 Open Championships)
"T" indicates a tie for a place

Team appearances
World Cup (representing Italy): 1966, 1967, 1968, 1969, 1971, 1972, 1973, 1974, 1975
Marlboro Nations' Cup/Philip Morris International (representing Italy): 1972, 1973, 1975, 1976
Double Diamond International (representing Continental Europe): 1972
Hennessy Cognac Cup (representing Continent of Europe): 1974

See also 

 1970 PGA Tour Qualifying School graduates

References

External links

Italian male golfers
European Tour golfers
European Senior Tour golfers
Sportspeople from Rome
1944 births
Living people
20th-century Italian people
21st-century Italian people